Rajouri or Rajauri is a city in the Rajouri district, within the Jammu division of the Indian union territory of Jammu and Kashmir. The city is the location of the birthplace of Sikh Rajput General Banda Singh Bahadur. Baba Ghulam Shah Badshah University is also situated in this district.

History

Ancient History 

Rajouri was Ruled by Many  Palas, and the Jarral Rajputs For 12th - 19th Century & Dogra Rajput Dynasty. Rajouri, finds its mention in the travelogue of Chinese traveler Hiuen-Tsang who visited the town in 632 A.D. and described it as a part of Kashmiri dominion. Later was included in the domain called Darabhisanga which comprised the hilly stretch from Poonch to Kashmir. Those days Laharkote in Poonch district and Rajouri had emerged as two powerful states of the area.

According to F.E.Pargitor, second branch of Aryan emigrants crossed Himalayas in the north and west and settled in Rajouri and Poonch area. Rajouri, Bhimber and Naushera were included within the territory of Abhisar, which was one of the hill states of Punjab Kingdom. Early records of fragmentary nature show that in 4th century B.C. there existed in the north west of India a federal type of political set up in which Abhisar with its capital Rajouri was also included. At the time of Alexander's invasion, Rajouri was at the height of its glory. In Mauryan period, the town of Rajouri was a great trade centre.

Albaruni visited Rajouri with Sultan Masud (Son of Sultan Mahmud) in 1036 C.E. In his book "India" he wrote name of Rajouri as Raja Vari. Srivar, the writer of 'Raj Tirangini' written during the administration of Sultan Zain-Ul-Abdin, also named this area as Raja Vari. It is believed that Raja Vari is a variant of Rajapuri. Mirza Zafarulla Khan, the writer of 'Tarikh Rajgan-E-Rajour' illustrated in his book that this place was in the beginning known as Raj-Avar and then altered from Rajour to Rajouri. But the old people in the villages still label the place as Rajour. With the course of time the name changed from Raja's Raj Avar to Raja Puri, Rajpuri to Raj Vari, Raj Vari to Raj Vara, Raj Vara to Raj Avar, Raj Avar to Rajour and then Rajour to Rajouri. As per Rajtirangini of Kalhan, Rajouri emerged as principality in about 1003 C.E. The first ruler of this kingdom was Raja Prithvi Paul. From 1033 to 1194 C.E. Raja Prithvi Paul defended Pir Panchal Pass at the time of incursion of Sultan Mehmud in 1021 C.E. Raja Sangram Paul safeguarded his Principality Rajouri when Raja Harash of Kashmir attacked his country in 1089 A.D. Sangram Paul fought so courageously that Raja Harash was obliged to return from Prithvi Paul fort without capturing Rajouri. Jarral Rajputs Muslim Rajas rebuilt Rajouri city at the time of their rule. A number of forts, sarais, mosques and baradaris were constructed.

As per 'Tarikh-Rajgan-e-Rajour" After accepting Islam after the Second Battle of Tarain and renaming himself, Raja Nooruddin Khan migrated from Punjab to Rajouri revolted against Raja Amna Paul. Raja Amna Paul was killed in the revolt and Raja Nooruddin Khan became the Raja of Rajouri. In this way Raja Nooruddin aid the foundation of Jarral Rajput Muslim rule in Rajouri in 1194 A.D. to 21 October 1846 A.D. Rajouri Principality remained governed by Jaral Rajas. The renowned Rajas of this dynasty were Raja Nooruddin Khan (1194 A.D.), Raja Anwar Khan A.D (1250.) Raja Sardar Khan (1289 A.D.), Raja Shabuddin Khan (1412 A.D.), Raja Sarmast Khan (1585 A.D.), Raja Tajuddin Khan (1600 A.D.), Raja Inyatullah Khan (1648 A.D.), Raja Azmatullah Khan (1683 A.D.), Raja Izzatullah Khan (1760 A.D.), Raja Karamullah Khan (1776 A.D.), Raja Agarullah Khan (1808 A.D.) and Raja Rahimullah Khan (1819 A.D.). Raja Faqirullah Khan (1846 A.D .) was the last Muslim Ruler of Rajouri who governed this principality upto 21 October 1846.

Early Modern History 
During the Mughal rule, the Muslim Jarral Rajput rulers or Raja agreed to a treaty with the Mughal Empire and thus were given the title 'Mirza'. In 1813, Gulab Singh of Jammu captured Rajouri for the Sikh Empire of Maharaja Ranjit Singh, by defeating Raja Agarullah Khan. After this, Rajouri became part of the Sikh Empire. But parts of it were given as jagirs to Raja Rahimullah Khan (the brother of Raja Agarullah Khan) and other parts to Gulab Singh.

Following the First Anglo-Sikh War and the Treaty of Amritsar (1846), all the territories between the Ravi River and the Indus were transferred to Gulab Singh, and he was recognised as an independent Maharaja of Jammu and Kashmir. Thus Rajouri became a part of the princely state of Jammu and Kashmir. Gulab Singh changed the name of Rajouri to Rampur. He appointed Mian Hathu as Governor of Rajouri, who remained in Rajouri up to 1856. Mian Hathu constructed a stunning temple in between Thanna Nallah in close proximity to Rajouri city. He also built Rajouri Fort at Dhannidhar village.

After Mian Hathu, Rajouri was transformed into a tehsil and affiliated with Bhimber district. In 1904, this tehsil was separated from Bhimber and affiliated with the Reasi district.

The area of Rajouri principality included proper Rajouri, Thanna, Bagla Azim Garh, Behrote, Chingus, Darhal, Nagrota and Phalyana etc.

The Rajas of Rajauri 

Raja Nakashena Rao,
Raja Barkha Rao,
Raja Parekh Rao, 
Raja Amber Maja Rao, 
Raja Shena Rao, 
Raja Ayan Rao, 
Raja Sangti Rao, 
Raja Jir Rao, 
Raja Kote Rao, 
Raja Dhaj Rao, 
Raja Nank Rao, 
Raja Sher Afghan Khan,
Raja Nooruddin Khan,
Raja Bahuaddin Khan,
Raja Anwar Khan,
Raja Haibat Khan,
Raja Sirdar Khan,
Raja Shahsawar Khan,
Raja Daulat Khan,
Raja Shahzaman Khan,
Raja Shabuddin Khan,
Raja Bahram Khan,
Raja Burhanuddin Khan,
Raja Bahudar Khan,
Raja Sarmast Khan,
Raja Tajuddin Khan,
Raja Hayatullah Khan,
Raja Inyatullah Khan,
Raja Hidyatullah Khan,
Raja Azmatullah Khan,
Raja Rahmatullah Khan,
Raja Izzatullah Khan,
Raja Karamullah Khan,
Raja Agarullah Khan,
Raja Rahimullah Khan,
Raja Faqirullah Khan

Partition 

After the Partition of India and the accession of Jammu and Kashmir to India in October 1947, there followed the First Kashmir War between India and Pakistan. The Pakistani raiders, along with the rebels and deserters from the western districts of the state, captured Rajouri on 7 November 1947. The 30,000 Hindus and Sikhs living in Rajouri were reportedly killed, wounded or abducted. Rajouri was recaptured on 12 April 1948 by the 19 Infantry Brigade of the Indian Army under the command of Second Lieutenant Rama Raghoba Rane. Rane, despite being wounded, launched a bold tank assault by conveying the tanks over the Tawi river bed in order to avoid the road blocks along the main road. When the Indian Army entered the town, the captors had fled, having destroyed most of the town and killing all its inhabitants. After the arrival of the Army, some 1,500 refugees that had fled to the hills, including women and children, returned to the town.

The ceasefire line at the end of the War ran to the west of the Rajouri-Reasi district.

Inside India 
Soon after the war, the Rajouri and Reasi tehsils were separated. The Rajouri tehsil was merged with the Indian-administered Poonch district to form the Poonch-Rajouri district.  The Reasi tehsil was merged with the Udhampur district.

On 1 January 1968, the two tehsils were reunited and the resulting district was named the Rajouri district.

The Reasi tehsil was also separated out in 2006 into a separate Reasi district. The present Rajouri district comprises the 1947 Rajouri tehsil.

Rajouri witnessed some of the toughest fighting during the Second Kashmir War in 1965. Pakistani infiltration in Kashmir during Operation Gibraltar caused Rajouri to be initially captured from the Indian Army by undercover Pakistani commandos with the aid of local Mujahideen. But the wider operation failed and, with all-out war with India looming, Pakistan withdrew its troops. Major Malik Munawar Khan Awan, a Pakistani commando officer who led the attack on Rajouri on the night of 15 September 1965, was later awarded the title "King of Rajouri" by the Government of Pakistan.

Geography and Education
It has an average elevation of 915 metres (3001 feet).

Rajouri has its own deemed University Baba Ghulam Shah Badshah University popularly known as BGSBU which offers various Diploma, UG and PG courses. It also has one Government Medical College GMC Rajouri along with other degree colleges.

Climate
The climate of Rajouri is somewhat cooler than the other surrounding plains. Summers are short and pleasant. The summer temperature generally does not exceed 41 degrees. Winters are cool and chilly characterized with rainfall due to western disturbances. Snowfall is scanty but may occur in cool months like that of December 2012. Average rainfall is 769 millimetres (26.3 in) in the wettest months The average temperature of summer is 29'C and average temperature of winter is 16'C .

Demographics

At the 2011 census, Rajouri itself had a population of 37,552 while the population within the municipal limits was 41,552. Males constituted 57% of the population and females 43%. Rajouri had an average literacy rate of 77%, higher than the national average of 75.5%: male literacy was 83% and female literacy was 68%. 12% of the population was under 6 years of age. The people are mostly Gujjars and Paharis.

Religion
Hinduism is the largest religion in Rajouri town followed by over 57% of the people. Islam is the second-largest religion with 37.08% adherents. Christianity and Sikhism form 0.51% and 5.09% of the population respectively.

Transport

Air
Rajouri Airport is located 1 km from the town but currently is non-operational. The nearest airport to Rajouri is Jammu Airport which located 154 kilometres from Rajouri and is a 4 hr drive. Helicopter services linking Rajouri district to Jammu started on September 13, 2017 but it was aborted later.

Rail
Rajouri doesn't have its own railway station. The nearest railway station to Rajouri is Jammu Tawi railway station which is located at a distance of 151 kilometres from the town and is a 4 hr drive. There are plans to connect Rajouri by rail through the Jammu–Poonch Railway Line in the near future.

Road
Rajouri is well-connected by road to other towns, villages and cities of Jammu and Kashmir. The NH 144A passes through Rajouri.

References

Bibliography 
 
 
 
 

Cities and towns in Rajouri district
Rajouri district